Portugal was present at the Eurovision Song Contest 1979, held in Jerusalem.

Before Eurovision

Festival da Canção 1979
The Portuguese national final to select their entry, the Festival da Canção 1979, was held on 24 February at the Cinema Monumental in Lisbon, and was hosted by José Fialho Gouveia and Manuela Moura Guedes. The musical director was Thilo Krasmann.

Three semi-finals in February narrowed the final selection from 27 eligible songs to nine; the top three winners in each of the three heats were chosen by a jury composed of 5 elements, each of them would have to score each song from 1 to 5 points depending on their analysis of each of the themes in the competition.. The regional juries came back, with twenty-two regional juries throughout Portugal, the Azores and the Madeira Islands picking the winner. Each district could vote for each song from zero to 10 points.

The winning entry was "Sobe, sobe, balão sobe", performed by Manuela Bravo and composed by Carlos Nóbrega e Sousa.

At Eurovision
Manuela Bravo was the first performer on the night of the contest, preceding Italy. At the close of the voting the song had received 64 points, placing 9th in a field of 19 competing countries. It was the highest ranking Portugal had received since 1972.

Voting

References

External links 
Portuguese National Final 1979

1979
Countries in the Eurovision Song Contest 1979
Eurovision